Shimen may refer to:

Mainland China
Shimen County, Hunan
Shijiazhuang, known as Shimen until 1948, the capital of Hebei province
Towns
Shimen, Chongqing, in Jiangjin District
Shimen, Tenzhu County, in Tenzhu (Tianzhu) Tibetan Autonomous County, Gansu
Shimen, Lulong County, Hebei
Shimen, Zunhua, Hebei
Shimen, Jilin, in Antu County
Shimen, Langao County, Shaanxi
Shimen, Luonan County, Shaanxi
Shimen, Xunyang County, Shaanxi
Shimen, Shandong, in Linshu County
Shimen, Jiangshan, Zhejiang
Shimen, Tongxiang, Zhejiang

Townships
Shimen Township, Anhui, in She County
Shimen Township, Chongqing, in Yunyang County
Shimen Township, Baiyin, in Jingyuan County, Gansu
Shimen Township, Lintan County, Gansu
Shimen Township, Longnan, in Wudu District, Longnan, Gansu
Shimen Township, Guizhou, in Weining Yi, Hui, and Miao Autonomous County
Shimen Township, Hebei, in Tang County
Shimen Township, Henan, in Nanzhao County
Shimen Township, Huaihua, in Hecheng District, Huaihua, Hunan
Shimen Township, Longhui County, Hunan
Shimen Township, Jiangxi, in Jinxi County
Shimen Township, Shaanxi, in Ganquan County
Shimen Township, Shanxi, in Wenxi County
Shimen Township, Sichuan, in Cangxi County

Taiwan
Shimen District, New Taipei
Shimen Dam, a gravity dam in Taoyuan County